Kirn-Land is a former Verbandsgemeinde ("collective municipality") in the district of Bad Kreuznach, in Rhineland-Palatinate, Germany. It was located around the town Kirn, which was the seat of Kirn-Land, but not part of the Verbandsgemeinde. On 1 January 2020 it was merged into the new Verbandsgemeinde Kirner Land.

Kirn-Land consists of the following Ortsgemeinden ("local municipalities"):

Former Verbandsgemeinden in Rhineland-Palatinate